The national emblem of East Germany featured a hammer and a compass, surrounded by a ring of rye. It was an example of what has been called "socialist heraldry". It was the only heraldic device of a European socialist state with a ring of grain which does not contain a red star.

Description 
The hammer represented the workers in the factories. The compass represented the intelligentsia, and the ring of rye the farmers. The first designs included only the hammer and ring of rye, as an expression of the GDR as a communist "Workers' and Farmers' state" (Arbeiter- und Bauernstaat). Surrounded by a wreath, the national emblem also acted as the emblem for the National People's Army, and when surrounded by a twelve pointed white star, for the People's Police.

When the federated states in East Germany were abolished and replaced by Bezirke, making the GDR into a unitary state, the national emblem came to be used by the Bezirke too. The East German government did not want regional symbols to be used, since they could stir up regional patriotism and movements for independence.

The emblem was adopted as the GDR's national emblem by a law of 26 September 1955, and added to the national flag by a law of 1 October 1959.

The emblem in West Germany
The display of the national emblem was for some years regarded as unconstitutional in West Germany and West Berlin and was prevented by the police. Only in 1969 did the West German government of Willy Brandt reverse this policy in what was known as Ostpolitik.

1990
After the ruling Socialist Unity Party fell from power, the political progress of die Wende saw suggestions for a new national emblem. One prominent suggestion was an image of a smith remaking a sword to a plough along with the text "" (German for "swords to ploughshares", from Isaiah 2:3–4), a well known symbol of peace. On 31 May the newly elected parliament (the ) decided, at a suggestion from the conservative German Social Union party, that all images of the national emblem on public buildings would be removed or covered. There was never a decision made for a new national coat of arms or emblem. The emblem was never formally abolished but became obsolete on the same moment the German Democratic Republic was dissolved, on 3 October 1990.

Gallery

See also 

 Hammer and sickle
 Square and Compasses
 Coat of arms of Germany
 State Emblem of the Soviet Union

References

Bibliography

External links  

 Gesetz über das Staatswappen und die Staatsflagge der Deutschen Demokratischen Republik
 Gesetz zur Änderung des Gesetzes über das Staatswappen und die Staatsflagge der Deutschen Demokratischen Republik

1950 establishments in East Germany
Symbols introduced in 1950
East Germany
East Germany
East Germany
Germany, East
National symbols of East Germany
East Germany
East Germany